Delaware gained a seat after the 1810 Census, and chose to elect both seats on a general ticket. The ten years between 1813 and 1823 were the only time when Delaware was represented by more than one Representative, and is one of only three states (the other two being Alaska and Wyoming) that have never been divided into districts.

Delaware elected its members October 6, 1812.

See also 
 United States House of Representatives elections, 1812 and 1813
 List of United States representatives from Delaware

1812
Delaware
United States House of Representatives